A total of 2,208 people sailed on the maiden voyage of the RMS Titanic, the second of the White Star Line's Olympic-class ocean liners, from Southampton, England, to New York City. Partway through the voyage, the ship struck an iceberg and sank in the early morning of 15 April 1912, resulting in the deaths of 1,503 people.

The ship's passengers were divided into three separate classes determined by the price of their ticket: those travelling in first class, most of them the wealthiest passengers on board, included prominent members of the upper class, businessmen, politicians, high-ranking military personnel, industrialists, bankers, entertainers, socialites, and professional athletes. Second-class passengers were predominantly middle-class travellers and included professors, authors, clergymen, and tourists. Third-class or steerage passengers were primarily immigrants moving to the United States and Canada.

First class 

The Titanic first-class list was a "who's who" of the prominent upper class in 1912. A single-person berth in first class cost between £30 and £870 for a parlour suite and small private promenade deck. First-class passengers enjoyed a number of amenities, including a gymnasium, a squash court, a saltwater swimming pool, electric and Turkish baths, a barbershop, kennels for first-class dogs, elevators, and both open and enclosed promenades. First-class passengers also traveled accompanied by personal staff—valets, maids, nurses and governesses for the children, chauffeurs, and cooks.

Many members of the British aristocracy made the trip: The Countess of Rothes, wife of the 19th Earl of Rothes, embarked at Southampton with her parents, Thomas and Clementina Dyer-Edwardes, and cousin Gladys Cherry. Colonel Archibald Gracie IV, a real estate investor and member of the wealthy Scottish-American Gracie family, embarked at Southampton. The Cavendishes of London were among other prominent British couples on board, as well. Lord Pirrie, chairman of Harland and Wolff, intended to travel aboard the Titanic, but illness prevented him from joining the ill-fated voyage; however, White Star Line's managing director J. Bruce Ismay and the ship's Harland and Wolff designer, Thomas Andrews, were both on board to oversee the ship's progress on her maiden voyage.

Some of the most prominent members of the American social elite made the trip: real estate builder, businessman, and multimillionaire Colonel John Jacob Astor IV and his 18-year-old pregnant wife Madeleine were returning to the United States for their child's birth. Astor was the wealthiest passenger aboard the ship and one of the richest men in the world; his great-grandfather John Jacob Astor was the first multi-millionaire in America. Among others were industrialist magnate and millionaire Benjamin Guggenheim; Macy's department store owner, and former member of the United States House of Representatives Isidor Straus, and his wife Ida; George Dennick Wick, founder and president of Youngstown Sheet and Tube Company; millionaire streetcar magnate George Dunton Widener; John B. Thayer, vice president of Pennsylvania Railroad, and his wife, Marian; Charles Hays, president of Canada's Grand Trunk Railway; William Ernest Carter and his wife, American socialite Lucile Carter; millionaire, philanthropist and women's rights activist Margaret Brown; tennis star and banker Karl Behr; famous American silent film actress Dorothy Gibson; prominent Buffalo architect Edward Austin Kent; and President William Howard Taft's military aide, Major Archibald Butt, who was returning to resume his duties after a six-week trip to Europe. Swedish first class passenger and businessman Mauritz Håkan Björnström-Steffansson owned the most highly valued single object on board: a masterpiece of French neoclassical painting entitled La Circassienne au Bain, for which he would later claim US$100,000 in compensation (equivalent to US$ million in ).

Milton S. Hershey, founder of Hershey's chocolate, made plans to sail aboard the ship's maiden voyage, but cancelled his booking before the ship set sail. J. P. Morgan is also rumored to have been planning to make the voyage and changed plans last-minute, but there is no substantiation of his ever having been booked.

Second class 
[[File:Titanic Band.jpg|left|thumb|The [[Musicians of the RMS Titanic|Titanic'''s musicians]], led by Wallace Hartley, were employed as crew, but given second-class accommodations.]]

Second-class passengers were leisure tourists, academics, members of the clergy, and middle-class English, Scottish and American families. The ship's musicians travelled in second-class accommodations; they were not counted as members of the crew, but were employed by an agency under contract to the White Star Line. The average ticket price for an adult second-class passenger was £13, the equivalent of £ today. and for many of these passengers, their travel experience on the Titanic was akin to travelling first class on smaller liners. Second-class passengers had their own library and the men had access to a private smoking room. Second-class children could read the children's books provided in the library or play deck quoits and shuffleboard on the second-class promenade. Twelve-year-old Ruth Becker passed the time by pushing her two-year-old brother Richard around the enclosed promenade in a stroller provided by the White Star Line.

Two Roman Catholic priests on board, Father Thomas Byles and Father Joseph Peruschitz, celebrated mass every day for second- and third-class passengers during the voyage. Father Byles gave his homilies in English, Irish, and French and Father Peruschitz gave his in German and Hungarian. Father Byles reportedly perished in the sinking, performing blessings and last rites for those trapped.

On the ship, a Lithuanian priest, Father Juozas Montvila, also perished during the sinking.

Rev. John Harper, a well-known Baptist pastor from Scotland, was travelling to the United States with his daughter and sister to preach at the Moody Church in Chicago.

Schoolteacher Lawrence Beesley, a science master at Dulwich College, spent much of his time aboard the ship in the library. Two months after the sinking, he wrote and published The Loss of the SS Titanic, the first eyewitness account of the disaster.

The Laroche family, father Joseph and daughters Simonne and Louise, were the only known passengers of black ancestry on board the ship. They, along with Joseph's pregnant wife Juliette, were travelling to Joseph's native island of Haiti. Joseph hoped that a move from their former home in Paris back to Haiti, where his uncle Cincinnatus Leconte was president, would take his family away from racial discrimination.

Another French family travelling in second class was the Navratils, travelling under the assumed name Hoffman. Michel Navratil, a Slovak-born French tailor, had kidnapped his two young sons, Michel Jr. and Edmond from his estranged wife, assumed the name Charles Hoffman, and boarded the ship in Southampton, intent on taking his children to the United States. Michel Sr. died in the sinking and photographs of the boys were circulated throughout the world in the hopes that their mother or another relative could identify the French toddlers, who became known as the "Titanic Orphans".
 After arriving in New York, the children were cared for by Titanic survivor Margaret Hays until their mother, Marcelle Navratil travelled from Nice, France, to claim them. The last living second-class survivor was Barbara West; she was 10 months old at the time of sinking and died in 2007 at the age of 96.

 Third class 

The third-class passengers or steerage passengers left hoping to start new lives in the United States and Canada. Third-class passengers paid £7 (£ today) for their ticket, depending on their place of origin; ticket prices often included the price of rail travel to the three departure ports. Tickets for children cost £3 (£ today).

Third-class passengers were a diverse group of nationalities and ethnic groups. In addition to large numbers of British, Irish, and Scandinavian immigrants, other passengers were from Central and Eastern Europe, the Levant (primarily Syria (Lebanon today)), and Hong Kong. Some travelled alone or in small family groups. Several groups of mothers were travelling alone with their young children—most going to join their husbands, who had already gone to America to find jobs, and having saved enough money, could now send for their families.

Among the larger third-class families were John and Annie Sage, who were immigrating to Jacksonville, Florida, with their 9 children, ranging in age from 4 to 20 years; Anders and Alfrida Andersson of Sweden and their five children, who were travelling to Canada along with Alfrida's younger sister Anna, husband Ernst, and baby Gilbert; and Frederick and Augusta Goodwin, who were moving with their six children to his new job at a power plant in New York. In 2007, scientists using DNA analysis identified the body of a small, fair-haired toddler, one of the first victims to be recovered by the CS Mackay Bennett, as Frederick and Augusta's youngest child, 19-month-old Sidney. The Sages, Anderssons and Goodwins all perished in the sinking.

The youngest passenger on board the ship, 2-month-old Millvina Dean, who with her parents Bertram Sr. and Eva Dean and older brother Bertram, was emigrating from England to Kansas, died in 2009. She was the last survivor of the Titanic disaster to die.

To compete with rival shipping company Cunard, the White Star Line offered their steerage passengers modest luxuries, in the hopes that emigrants would write to relatives back home and encourage them to travel on White Star Line ships. Third-class passengers had their own dining facilities, with chairs instead of benches, and meals prepared by the third-class kitchen staff. On other liners, the steerage-passengers would have been expected to bring their own food. Rather than dormitory-style sleeping areas, third-class passengers had their own cabins. The single men and women were separated, women in the stern in two to six berth cabins, men in the bow in up to 10 berth cabins, often shared with strangers. Each stateroom was fitted with wood panelling and beds with mattresses, blankets, pillows, electric lights, heat, and a washbasin with running water, except for the bow cabins, which did not have a private washbasin. Two public bathtubs were also provided, one for the men, the other for women.

Passengers gathered in the third-class common room, where they could play chess or cards, or walk along the poop deck. Third-class children played in the common room or explored the ship. Nine-year-old Frank Goldsmith recalled peering into the engine room and climbing up the baggage cranes on the poop deck.

Ship's regulations were designed to keep third-class passengers confined to their area of the ship. The Titanic was fitted with grilles to prevent the classes from mingling and these gates were normally kept closed, although the stewards could open them in the event of an emergency. In the rush following the collision, the stewards, occupied with waking up sleeping passengers and leading groups of women and children to the boat deck, did not have time to open all the gates, leaving many of the confused third-class passengers stuck below decks.

 Ticket-holders who did not sail 
Numerous notable and prominent people of the era, who held tickets for the westbound passage or were guests of those who held tickets, did not sail. Others were waiting in New York to board for the passage back to Plymouth, England, on the second leg of Titanics maiden voyage. Many of the unused tickets that survived, whether they were for the westbound passage or the return eastbound passage, have become quite valuable as Titanic-related artifacts. Those who held tickets for a passage, but did not actually sail, include Theodore Dreiser, Henry Clay Frick, Milton S. Hershey, Guglielmo Marconi, John Pierpont Morgan, John Mott, George Washington Vanderbilt II.

Passengers by ethnicity
It has been widely thought that there were more than 80 passengers from the Ottoman Empire, including Turkish, Armenian and Levantine backgrounds.

 Bulgarian passengers 

According to official data from Lloyd's insurance company, 38 of the passengers aboard the Titanic, were Bulgarians. There are assumptions that the number of Bulgarian citizens exceeds 50. 

Near the town of Troyan in Bulgaria, there is a cenotaph monument to the 8 inhabitants of the village of Gumoshtnik who died, whose names were probably not on the list of the insurance company.  The estimated number of surviving Bulgarians is 15, with many remaining in the United States. In memory of the Bulgarians who died on the Titanic from the village of Terziysko - Minko Angelov and Hristo Danchev, a folk song was created.

 Syrian passengers 
Several passengers on the Titanic had Levantine origins. At the time, many carried identification from the Ottoman Empire that stated they were from Greater Syria, which included Palestine, Jordan, Lebanon, and Syria.

According to Bakhos Assaf, mayor of Hardin, Lebanon, 93 passengers originated from what is today Lebanon, with 20 of them from Hardin, the highest number of any Lebanese location. Of the Hardin passengers, 11 adult men died, while eight women and children and one adult man survived. Kamal Seikaly, an individual quoted in an article from the Lebanese publication The Daily Star, stated that according to a 16 May 1912, issue of the Al-Khawater magazine stored in the American University of Beirut, of the 125 Lebanese aboard, 23 survived. The magazine states that 10 people from Kfar Meshki died on the Titanic. According to author Judith Geller, "officially [there] were 154 Syrians on board the Titanic and 29 were saved: four men, five children, and 20 women".

In 1997, Ray Hanania, a Palestinian American journalist, watched the Titanic (1997) film and noticed some background characters saying yalla, meaning "hurry" in Arabic. This prompted him to research the issue and he discovered that Arab passengers were on board. In 1998, he wrote a column about the Arabs on the RMS Titanic, "Titanic: We Share the Pain But Not the Glory." According to Hanania's analysis, 79 Arab passengers were on board the ship, though the task to "identify precisely" which passengers were Arab is difficult. Hanania stated that many were Christians because church sponsorship made getting passage easier for Christians as opposed to Muslims and Christians were more likely to emigrate due to persecution by the Ottoman regime. An in-depth study was made by Leila Salloum Elias about the lives of Syrian, as well as Armenian passengers aboard the ship, using volumes of research taken from Arabic newspapers contemporary to the sinking to clarify the names and circumstances of many Syrian passengers. The total number of Syrian passengers, according to Syrian survivors was between 145 and 165, of these, only one couple who boarded as second-class passengers. Salloum's passenger count is based on the contemporary sources of the sinking in which names are clarified and given based on their true and authentic Arabic names, families and village, town or city of origin.

Chinese passengers
Eight passengers are listed on the passenger list with a home country of China, from the hometown of Hong Kong, with a destination of New York. Six of these persons survived the disaster. They were not permitted to enter the United States due to the Chinese Exclusion Act. One of these Chinese survivors from the Titanic disaster was Fang Lang (21 June 1894 – 21 January 1986; alias Fong Wing Sun), who was one of the four passengers whom Fifth Officer Harold Lowe rescued from the ocean after returning in Lifeboat 14 to search for any survivors still stranded in the sea. Fang settled in US, and one of Fang's fellow survivors Lee Bing moved to Canada living in Galt, Ontario (worked at White Rose Cafe), then Toronto and disappears having left for China. The stories of the Chinese survivors, which were forgotten for over a century, were presented in a 2021 documentary film The Six after researchers and show producers worked together to piece together the whereabouts and lives of the Chinese survivors after the sinking of the Titanic.

Survivors and victims

Shortly before midnight, Captain Edward Smith ordered the ship's lifeboats to be readied and a distress call was sent out. Forty-five minutes after the ship hit the iceberg, Captain Smith ordered the lifeboats to be loaded and lowered under the orders women and children first.

The first lifeboat launched was Lifeboat 7 on the starboard side with 28 people on board out of a capacity of 65. It was lowered around 12:45 am as believed by the British Inquiry. Collapsible Boat D was the last lifeboat to be launched, at 1:55. Two more lifeboats, Collapsible Boats A and B, were in the process of being removed from their location on the roof of the officer's house, but could not be properly launched. Collapsible B floated away from the ship upside down, while Collapsible A became half-filled with water after the supports for its canvas sides were broken in the fall from the roof of the officers' quarters. Arguments occurred in some of the lifeboats about going back to pick up people in the water, but many survivors were afraid of being swamped by people trying to climb into the lifeboat or being pulled down by the suction from the sinking Titanic, though it turned out that very little suction had happened. At 2:20 am, Titanic herself sank. A small number of passengers and crew were able to make their way to the two unlaunched collapsible boats, surviving for several hours (some still clinging to the overturned Collapsible B) until they were rescued by Fifth Officer Harold Lowe.

At 4:10 am, Carpathia arrived at the site of the sinking and began rescuing survivors. By 8:30 am, she picked up the last lifeboat with survivors and left the area at 08:50 bound for Pier 54 in New York City. Of the 711 passengers and crew rescued by the Carpathia, six, including first-class passenger William F. Hoyt, either died in a lifeboat during the night or on board the Carpathia the next morning, and were buried at sea.

In the days following the sinking, several ships sailed to the disaster area to recover victims' bodies. The White Star Line chartered the cable ship Mackay-Bennett from Halifax, Nova Scotia, to retrieve bodies. Three other ships followed in the search: the cable ship Minia, the lighthouse supply ship Montmagny, and the sealing vessel Algerine. Each ship left with embalming supplies, undertakers, and clergy. Upon recovery, each body retrieved by the Mackay-Bennett was numbered and given as detailed a description as possible to help aid in identification. The physical appearance of each body—height, weight, age, hair and eye colour, visible birthmarks, scars or tattoos, was catalogued and any personal effects on the bodies were gathered and placed in small canvas bags corresponding to their number.

The ship found so many bodies – 306 – that the embalming supplies aboard were quickly exhausted. Health regulations permitted that only embalmed bodies could be returned to port. Captain Larnder of the Mackay-Bennett and the undertakers aboard decided to preserve all bodies of first-class passengers because of the need to visually identify wealthy men to resolve any disputes over large estates. As a result, the majority of the 116 burials at sea were third-class passengers and crew (only 56 were identified). Larnder himself claimed that as a mariner, he would expect to be buried at sea. However, complaints about the burials at sea were made by families and undertakers. Later ships such as Minia found fewer bodies, requiring fewer embalming supplies, and were able to limit burials at sea to bodies that were too damaged to preserve.

190 bodies recovered were preserved and taken to Halifax, Nova Scotia, the closest city to the sinking with direct rail and steamship connections. A large temporary morgue was set up in a curling rink, and undertakers were called in from all across Eastern Canada to assist. Relatives from across North America came to identify and claim the bodies of their relatives. Some bodies were shipped to be buried in their home towns across North America and Europe. About two-thirds of the bodies were identified. Of the remaining 150 unclaimed bodies, 121 were taken to the non-denominational Fairview Lawn Cemetery; 19 were buried in the Roman Catholic Mount Olivet Cemetery, and 10 were taken to the Jewish Baron de Hirsch Cemetery. Unidentified victims were buried with simple numbers based on the order in which their bodies were discovered.

Although several people managed to reach this lifeboat, three died during the night. When Fifth Officer Harold Lowe and six crewmen returned to the wreck site after the sinking with an empty lifeboat to pick up survivors, they rescued surviving passengers from Collapsible A, but left the three dead bodies in the boat: Thomson Beattie, a first-class passenger, and two crew members, a fireman and a seaman. After their retrieval from Collapsible A by Oceanic, the bodies were buried at sea.

Passenger list

The following is a full list of known passengers who sailed on the maiden voyage of the RMS Titanic.

Included in this list are the nine-member Guarantee Group and the eight members of the ship's band, listed as both passengers and crew. They are also included in the list of crew members on board RMS Titanic.

Passengers are colour-coded, indicating whether they were saved or perished.
 The passenger did not survive
 The passenger survived
Survivors are listed with the lifeboat from which they were known to be rescued. Victims whose remains were recovered after the sinking are listed with a superscript next to the body number, indicating the recovery vessel:
MB – CS Mackay-Bennett (bodies 1–306)
M – CS Minia (bodies 307–323)
MM – CGS Montmagny (bodies 326–329)
A – SS Algerine (body 330)
O – RMS Oceanic (bodies 331–333)
I – SS Ilford (body 334)
OT – SS Ottawa  (body 335)

Numbers 324 and 325 were unused, and the six bodies buried at sea by the Carpathia also went unnumbered.

First class

 Second class 

 Third class 

Cross-channel passengers
In addition to the above-listed passengers, the Titanic'' carried 29 cross-channel passengers who boarded at Southampton and disembarked at either Cherbourg, France, or Queenstown, Ireland.

First passenger survivors to die

Last passenger survivors to die

See also
Crew of the RMS Titanic

Footnotes

References

Further reading
 
 
 
 Newspaper interview with passenger John Pillsbury Snyder.

External links

Shipwrecked people
Lists of victims